Austmarka is a village in Alver Municipality (formerly Radøy Municipality) in Vestland county, Norway.

References

Villages in Vestland
Alver (municipality)